Cionus scrophulariae, commonly known as the figwort weevil is a species of weevil native to Europe.

References

Curculionidae
Beetles described in 1758
Beetles of Europe
Taxa named by Carl Linnaeus